In geometry, the order-7 heptagonal tiling is a regular tiling of the hyperbolic plane. It has Schläfli symbol of {7,7}, constructed from seven heptagons around every vertex. As such, it is self-dual.

Related tilings 

This tiling is a part of regular series {n,7}:

See also

Square tiling
Uniform tilings in hyperbolic plane
List of regular polytopes

References
 John H. Conway, Heidi Burgiel, Chaim Goodman-Strass, The Symmetries of Things 2008,  (Chapter 19, The Hyperbolic Archimedean Tessellations)

External links 

 Hyperbolic and Spherical Tiling Gallery
 KaleidoTile 3: Educational software to create spherical, planar and hyperbolic tilings
 Hyperbolic Planar Tessellations, Don Hatch

Heptagonal tilings
Hyperbolic tilings
Isogonal tilings
Isohedral tilings
Order-7 tilings
Regular tilings
Self-dual tilings